The 996 working hour system is a work schedule practiced by some companies in the People's Republic of China. It derives its name from its requirement that employees work from 9:00 am to 9:00 pm, 6 days per week; i.e. 72 hours per week. A number of Mainland Chinese internet companies have adopted this system as their official work schedule. Critics argue that the 996 working hour system is a violation of Chinese Labour Law and have called it "modern slavery".

In March 2019, an "anti-996" protest was launched via GitHub. Since then, the 996 issue has been met with growing discontent in China, and despite China's official promises that the 996 working hour system will disappear, it is still widely present. In 2021, an academic study by Chinese institutions recognized the existence of "excessive-work cultures like '996 for the first time.

Background 

The culture of overtime work has a long history in Chinese IT companies, where the focus is typically on speed and cost reduction. Companies employ a range of measures, such as reimbursing taxi fares for employees who remain working at the office late into the night, to encourage overtime work.

Long time working system brings various diseases and mental disorders to Chinese workers. It is estimated that more than three-quarters of urban workers in big cities like Beijing, Shanghai, and Guangzhou suffer from work-related fatigue, musculoskeletal pain, sleep  or eating disorders, occupational stress, and work-family imbalance. According to China's state-owned media People's Daily, a 2013 survey showed that 98.8% of Chinese IT industry workers said they had health problems. Numerous overwork deaths and suicides have occurred during past decades due to the 996 system and other overtime working system in China.

In 2020, a study found that "Chinese businesses are more likely to follow long work hours than American ones". Another study likened 996 culture to "modern slavery", formed through the combination of "unrestricted global capitalism and a Confucian culture of hierarchy and obedience". In 2021, for the first time, a Chinese study recognized the existence of "excessive-work cultures like 996" to an extent that, if not corrected, it can dilute the gains from China's dual circulation policy.

Relevant legislation 
The Labour Law of the People's Republic of China states:Chapter 4　Article 36　The State shall practise a working hour system wherein labourers shall work for no more than eight hours a day and no more than 44 hours a week on an average.

Article 41　The employer can prolong work hours due to needs of production or businesses after consultation with its trade union and labourers. The work hours to be prolonged, in general, shall be no longer than one hour a day, or no more than three hours a day if such prolonging is called for due to special reasons and under the condition that the physical health of labourers is guaranteed. The work time to be prolonged shall not exceed, however, 36 hours a month.

Article 44　The employer shall pay labourers more wage remunerations than those for normal work according to the following standards in any one of the following cases:

(1) Wage payments to labourers no less than 150 percent of their wages if the labourers are asked to work longer hours; 
(2) Wage payments to labourers no less than 200 percent of their wages if no rest can be arranged afterwards for the labourers asked to work on days of rest; 
(3) Wage payments to labourers no less than 300 percent of their wages if the labourers are asked to work on legal holidays.

Chapter 12　Article 90　If the employer prolongs work hours in violation of stipulations in this Law, labour administrative departments can give it a warning, order it to make corrections, and may impose a fine thereon.

Article 91　The employer involved in any one of the following cases that encroach upon the legitimate rights and interests of labourers shall be ordered by labour administrative departments to pay labourers wage remunerations or to make up for economic losses, and may even order it to pay compensation:

(2) Refusal to pay labourers wage remunerations for working longer hours;

Companies involved

58.com 
In September 2016, the classified advertising website 58.com officially declared its adoption of the 996 working hour system, attracting criticism from employees and social commentators. The company responded that the 996 system would be an encouraged, not compulsory, practice.

ByteDance 
A CNBC article in May 2021 reported that workers at TikTok's parent company ByteDance were unhappy with the 996 work culture there and that people were turning down job opportunities at TikTok because of it.  In November 2021, ByteDance moved away from 996 and mandated somewhat shorter working hours. Nevertheless, on 23 February 2022, the sudden death was reported of a 28-year-old employee at ByteDance, after he posted a message on Maimai, a career and social networking platform, the night before. ByteDance later issued a statement that was shared in an internal letter with its staff in China, according to which the employee felt dizzy after an hour of exercise at the company gym, before he was taken to the hospital. The incident raised scrutiny of the frequent overtime demands of Chinese tech companies.

JD.com 
After 58.com's 996 schedule was made known to the public, an internal email from the vice-president Gang He of JD.com was leaked online, which contained a demand for the management team of JD.com to implement the 996 working hour system "on a flexible basis".

On 15 March 2019, an employee of JD.com alleged that some departments have begun implementing the 995 schedule (9am-9pm, but 5 days per week), while other departments have already finished doing so. Following the report, the public relations department of JD.com announced that overtime work was not compulsory.

Richard Liu, the founder of the company, referred to people complaining about the work schedule as "slackers".

Pinduoduo 
In early January 2021, the e-commerce platform Pinduoduo was accused of forcing its employees to do extremely intensive overtimes, which supposedly led to the karoshi death of a 22-year-old worker. Later, the official account of Pinduoduo posted (but deleted shortly afterwards) an answer on Zhihu, saying "Those who are at the bottom of the society earn their wages at the risk of losing their lives".

Just a few days after the early January accident, another employee committed suicide by jumping. On January 10, news sources reported that Pinduoduo fired an employee who posted photos showing his colleague being carried into an ambulance.

Youzan 
In January 2019, an employee of Youzan stated on the social platform Maimai that their supervisor had enforced the 996 schedule. Bai Ya, the CEO of Youzan, replied, "it would be a good thing to look back at a few years later". Some media outlets criticized this schedule. Later that month, the Labour Supervision Group of Xihu District, Hangzhou announced that the company was under investigation.

Others 
At least 40 companies, including Huawei and Alibaba Group, have implemented the 996 schedule or an even more intensive alternative.

Online protests

996.ICU GitHub campaign 
 
On 26 March 2019, the 996.ICU repository and website were created. The repository on GitHub states that the name "996.icu" refers to how developers who work under the 996 system (9AM–9PM, 6 days per week) would risk poor health and a possible stay in an intensive care unit. The movement's slogan is "developers' lives matter".

Two days later, on 28 March 2019, the repository had already received 50 thousand stars, and 100 thousand stars on 30 March 2019, which made it the top trending repository on GitHub. The repository reached 120 thousand stars on 31 March 2019, and 200 thousand stars on 9 April 2019, making it the second most starred repository on GitHub. The flurry of activity led to the "issue" page of the repository to be flooded with spam and shut down, which was hotly discussed on Zhihu, Sina Weibo, and WeChat.

Browser blacklist  
On 2 April 2019, it was widely reported that Tencent's QQ browser and WeChat, Alibaba's UC Browser, Qihoo 360's 360 Browser, and many other Chromium-based Mainland Chinese browsers blocked the 996.icu repository on GitHub, describing it as "an illegal and fraudulent site".

Support by Microsoft employees  
On 18 April 2019, employees at Microsoft and GitHub created a GitHub repository named "support.996.ICU" in support of the 996.ICU campaign, which they believe could be under threat of Chinese government censorship.

Reactions

Support 
Jack Ma stated that workers should consider 996 "a huge blessing" as there is no way to "achieve the success [one] want[s] without paying extra effort and time", while Richard Liu, founder of JD.com, said that "Slackers are not my brothers!" Jason Calacanis, an entrepreneur and angel investor, describes 996 as "the same exact work ethic that built America".

Criticism 
Several Chinese media outlets criticized the 996 working system. Xin Shi Ping of the Xinhua News Agency said that the system "violates labor law and overtakes health and the future. It does harm to hard-working workers and it is a misunderstanding of the hard-working spirit". People's Daily says that "advocating 'hard work' does not mean resorting to and enforcing the 996 system", while the China News Service says that "It is unnecessary to exchange life for money".

Beijing Daily criticized Jack Ma and Richard Liu for "boasting" the 996 work schedule, claiming that "It's aimed at disguising reduction of salary of lay-off", while Wang Xinya, a writer for Banyuetan, stated that some entrepreneurs disregarded the law and associate 996 with hard work, calling it "poisonous" chicken soup. Wang also stated that the system has nothing to do with employee diligence, but has everything to do with company interests.

Dutch programmer Guido van Rossum remarked that the 996 work schedule is "inhumane". In 2021, Chinese scholars stressed on policy-makers that "there is a need to reform work policies to realize the lowering of working time per worker in China (and also to curb excessive-work cultures like 996)". They argued, without such initiatives the dual circulation policy is doomed to fail.

Legal issues 
The 996 working hour system was deemed illegal by the Supreme People's Court on 27 August 2021. However, it has been doubted whether it will be fully enforced.

See also 
 Buddha-like mindset
 Eight-hour day
Forty-Hour Week Convention, 1935
 Karōshi
 Lochner v. New York, Lochner era
 Simple living
 Tang ping
 Wage theft
 Working time

Notes

References

External links 
 996.icu
 
 

GitHub
Labor rights
Information technology in China
Economy of China
Labor in China
Chinese labour law
Ethically disputed working conditions